William David Baillie  (28 May 1934 – 25 December 2018) was a New Zealand runner, who represented his country at the 1964 Summer Olympics in Tokyo. There, he placed sixth in the 5000 m. He also competed at the 1954, 1958, 1962, and 1966 British Empire and Commonwealth Games. At the time of his death, he held New Zealand records for the 20000 m and the 1 hour events.

In the 2001 Queen's Birthday Honours, Baillie was appointed a Member of the New Zealand Order of Merit, for services to athletics.

Baillie died in Cooks Beach on 25 December 2018 at the age of 84.

Personal bests

References

External links 
 
 
 Profile at trackfield.brinkster.net
 Profile at the New Zealand Sports Hall of Fame

1934 births
2018 deaths
Sportspeople from Nelson, New Zealand
New Zealand male long-distance runners
Olympic male long-distance runners
Olympic athletes of New Zealand
Athletes (track and field) at the 1964 Summer Olympics
Commonwealth Games competitors for New Zealand
Athletes (track and field) at the 1954 British Empire and Commonwealth Games
Athletes (track and field) at the 1958 British Empire and Commonwealth Games
Athletes (track and field) at the 1962 British Empire and Commonwealth Games
Athletes (track and field) at the 1966 British Empire and Commonwealth Games
Japan Championships in Athletics winners
New Zealand Athletics Championships winners
Australian Athletics Championships winners
Members of the New Zealand Order of Merit